Thersistrombus thersites, common name : the thersite conch,  is a species of sea snail, a marine gastropod mollusk in the family Strombidae, the true conchs.

Description
The shell size varies between 100 mm and 170 mm.

Distribution
This species is distributed in the Western Pacific Ocean and along the Philippines.

References

External links
 

Strombidae
Gastropods described in 1823